Miss Earth Puerto Rico (previously called Miss Puerto Rico) is a national Beauty pageant in Puerto Rico.

History
The Miss Puerto Rico Universe organization sent representatives to Miss Earth between 2001–2004. From 2005 to 2013 Puerto Rico's representative to Miss Earth was selected through the Miss Puerto Rico Earth pageant. Puerto Rico did not compete in 2007–2008, 2013 and 2015–2016. Nellys Pimentel made history becoming the first Puerto Rican to win Miss Earth in 2019.

Representatives
The following titleholders have represented Puerto Rico in three of the Big Four major international beauty pageants for women.

Color key

Representative to Miss Earth

See also
Puerto Rico at major beauty pageants

References

External links
 Miss Earth

Beauty pageants in Puerto Rico
Puerto Rico